was a kōke (master of ceremonies). His court title was Kōzuke no suke (上野介). He is famous as the adversary of Asano Naganori in the events of the Forty-seven rōnin.  Although his name (義央) has been long pronounced as "Yoshinaka" especially in dramas and novels, written by an anonymous contemporary in 1703, recorded that his name was "Yoshihisa."

Life

Family and early life
Born in 1641, he was the eldest son of Kira Yoshifuyu. His mother was a member of the high-ranking Sakai clan. On the death of his father in 1668, Yoshinaka became the 17th head of the household, inheriting lands evaluated at 4200 koku. His wife was from the Uesugi clan, and his eldest son was adopted by Uesugi Tsunakatsu, the head of the Dewa Yonezawa han, taking the name Tsunanori. Yoshinaka named his second son as his heir, but when that heir died, Yoshinaka adopted Tsunanori's second son, strengthening the connection between the Kira and the Uesugi.

Career
As a kōke, Kira oversaw matters of protocol. In 1701, he was assigned the task of tutoring Asano Naganori in matters of protocol in preparation for an upcoming visit by representatives of the Emperor. According to the stories, Kira was corrupt and demanded bribes for the tutoring, which Asano refused to pay. Kira then began to publicly insult Asano, calling him an ignorant and unmannered rural boor. On the day when the envoys were scheduled to meet the shōgun at Edo Castle, Asano drew his wakizashi and attempted to kill Kira in retaliation for the insults. For this, Asano was sentenced to commit seppuku, his house abolished and his retainers branded rōnin, while Kira went unpunished.

Assassination
On the night of January 30, 1703 (14th day, 12th month, year Genroku-15, according to the Japanese calendar), Asano's retainers broke into Kira's mansion, after almost two years of careful and secret planning, and killed him in revenge. They then surrendered themselves to the shogunate authorities and were ordered to commit seppuku for the murder.

The Tokugawa shogunate condemned the grandson of Yoshinaka to death for being incapable of protecting his family like a samurai; the Kira were also dispossessed and lost the rank of koke. After the death of Uesugi Tsunakatsu, the revenues of the Uesugi were reduced from 300,000 koku to 150,000 koku. On the other hand, the brother of Asano Naganori was re–established, received a revenue of 5,000 koku and the rank of hatamoto.

In popular culture
The ghost of Kira appears in Episode 113 of Lupin III Part 2. He meets Lupin in the lobby of a theater where the Chuushingura play is being performed, and employs him to look for a treasure. Eventually, it turns out the treasure is Kira's false teeth, which he needed to cross over into the next world.

References

Sources 
新井政義（編集者）『日本史事典』。東京：旺文社１９８７(p. 115)
竹内理三（編）『日本史小辞典』。東京：角川書店１９８５(p. 314)

1641 births
1703 deaths
Samurai
Assassinated Japanese politicians
Assassinated military personnel
Kabuki plays